The 1988 TranSouth 500 was the fifth stock car race of the 1988 NASCAR Winston Cup Series season and the 32nd iteration of the event. The race was held on Sunday, March 27, 1988, before an audience of 58,000 in Darlington, South Carolina, at Darlington Raceway, a  permanent egg-shaped oval racetrack. The race took the scheduled 367 laps to complete. In the late stages of the race, Lake Speed, driving for his owner-driver operation Speed Racing, would dominate the late stages of the race with Hoosier tires to score his first and only career NASCAR Winston Cup Series victory and his only victory of the season. To fill out the podium, AK Racing driver Alan Kulwicki and Robert Yates Racing driver Davey Allison would finish second and third, respectively.

Background 

Darlington Raceway is a race track built for NASCAR racing located near Darlington, South Carolina. It is nicknamed "The Lady in Black" and "The Track Too Tough to Tame" by many NASCAR fans and drivers and advertised as "A NASCAR Tradition." It is of a unique, somewhat egg-shaped design, an oval with the ends of very different configurations, a condition which supposedly arose from the proximity of one end of the track to a minnow pond the owner refused to relocate. This situation makes it very challenging for the crews to set up their cars' handling in a way that is effective at both ends.

Entry list 

 (R) denotes rookie driver.

Qualifying 
Qualifying was split into two rounds. Pole qualifying for the race was held on Thursday, March 24, 1988. Per the NASCAR rules in 1988, a one-lap qualifying attempt was utilized. The top twenty cars in pole qualifying were locked into the starting field. The remainder of the cars could stand on their time, or make a new attempt in second-round qualifying. If a driver did decide to make an attempt, their first-round times would be scrubbed. Second-round qualifying was held Friday, March 25, 1988. The drivers that had qualified 1st–20th on Thursday were locked-in to those positions and did not have to re-qualify.

No drivers would fail to qualify.

Full qualifying results

Race results

References 

1988 NASCAR Winston Cup Series
NASCAR races at Darlington Raceway
March 1988 sports events in the United States
1988 in sports in South Carolina